Wide-Eyed and Legless (known in the US as The Wedding Gift) is a 1993 made-for-TV British drama film, directed by Richard Loncraine starring Julie Walters, Jim Broadbent, Sian Thomas and Thora Hird.

It is based on the 1989 book Diana's Story by the writer Deric Longden, who co-wrote the script with Jack Rosenthal. The film tells the story of the final years of Deric's (played by Broadbent) marriage to his wife, Diana (Julie Walters), who contracted a degenerative illness that medical officials were unable to understand at the time, though now believed to be a form of chronic fatigue syndrome or myalgic encephalomyelitis. As Diana's health deteriorated, she encourages him to spend time with another woman who Longden has met (the partially-sighted novelist Aileen Armitage (played by Sian Thomas)), to help ease his pain over her eventual death.

Title and home media
Wide-Eyed and Legless was the original title of the TV adaptation shown on BBC One whilst for the American release the film's title changed to The Wedding Gift. The film was released on Region 1 DVD.

Cast
Jim Broadbent - Deric Longden
Julie Walters - Diana
Thora Hird - Annie Longden
Sian Thomas - Aileen Armitage
Moya Brady - Sheila
Andrew Lancel - Nick
Anastasia Mulrooney - Sally
Frances Cox - Minnie Bonsall

Sequel
An award-winning sequel, Lost for Words, focusing on Longden's elderly mother Annie (Thora Hird) and her decline into dementia, after his second marriage (to writer Armitage) followed in 1999 and saw Hird reprise her role, whilst the other cast members were replaced.

Year-end lists
8th – Michael MacCambridge, Austin American-Statesman
Top 10 (not ranked) – George Meyer, The Ledger

References

External links

Archive of Deric Longden's official website

1993 films
British drama films
1990s English-language films
Films directed by Richard Loncraine
Films scored by Colin Towns
1990s British films